Joseph P. Winston House, also known as the Winston House, is a historic residence in Richmond, Virginia, United States. It was built in 1873-1874 for wholesale grocer Joseph P. Winston, and is a -story, three bay, brick residence.  It features a half-story, ogee-curved mansard roof with black slate shingles.  It also has an elaborate cast-iron front porch and original cast-iron picket fence with gate.  Also included is the adjacent Richmond Art Company Building.  It was designed in 1920 by prominent architect Duncan Lee, and is a three-story, stuccoed brick building in a Spanish-Mediterrean Revival style.

It was added to the National Register of Historic Places on June 11, 1979.  It is located in the Grace Street Commercial Historic District.

See also
National Register of Historic Places listings in Richmond, Virginia

References

Houses on the National Register of Historic Places in Virginia
Commercial buildings on the National Register of Historic Places in Virginia
Mediterranean Revival architecture in the United States
Houses completed in 1874
Commercial buildings completed in 1875
Houses in Richmond, Virginia
National Register of Historic Places in Richmond, Virginia
Individually listed contributing properties to historic districts on the National Register
Historic district contributing properties in Virginia